Foradian Technologies is a privately held software provider of ERP Solutions for education institutions. Foradian is based in Bangalore, Karnataka, India. The technical office of the firm is situated in Bengaluru, Karnataka, India.

The company's flagship product Fedena is an open source school management software that is used in over 40,000 schools and 20 million users in over 100 countries. A notable implementation of Fedena is its use in over 15,000 schools in the state of Kerala, India. The Education Department of the Government of Kerala has used Fedena in a state program named Sampoorna to automate the system and process of over 15,000 schools in the state. Uzity is a virtual learning environment and course management system developed by Foradian that assists teachers and students to collaborate and learn the contents of different courses.

Foradian is also known for popularizing the joke character Tintumon, via the provision of an online identity and releasing rupee font for Indian rupee sign which was reported in major national media and newspapers

History
Foradian Technologies was started as a web design firm by a group of young people in India from the states of Kerala and Karnataka. Products include Fedena Opensource, Fedena Pro, Uzity, and Fluxday.

Products

Fedena 
Fedena is an open source school management software based on Ruby on Rails framework. It was selected for a presentation at International Rubyconf held at Bangalore in March 2010. Fedena is also presented in the Debconf 2010. Fedena v3.5 was released on 15 February 2016, and Fedena is available in 22 languages, including English. Foradian Technologies also provide Fedena related services, Fedena – PRO and Fedena Enterprise.

Uzity
Uzity is a virtual learning environment and course management system developed by Foradian Technologies. It is a collaboration platform for students, teachers, administrators and management of an institution. Uzity assists in knowledge management of the entire institution and functions as a repository of course, information and collaboration data. It is developed by the same team who developed Fedena.

Rupee Foradian Font 
As soon as the new Indian Rupee sign was approved, Foradian technologies published a free digital font named "Rupee Foradian" on 16 July 2010. The font and the blog became a viral phenomenon. The font was created using a vector image and its mapping is to the grave accent key of the keyboard, which was chosen because the grave accent key is often not used by computer users. The font received some criticism for the mapping to the grave accent key, and per being released much ahead of its approval for unicode. The Rupee sign may be made visible on some word-processors also where the font is not installed in the system, by choosing to embed the font in the document in file saving options. However, embedding the Foradian Rupee Font renders the document read-only, i.e., the document cannot be edited on a system where the font is not installed.

Recognition
For the development and support of Fedena, Foradian won the MIT TR35 2012 India award for innovation in education domain. Foradian also came fifteenth in the Deloitte Technology Fast50. Foradian received the IT Innovation Award – MSME Category at the Express I.T Awards, 2014.

References

Further reading

External links
  
 
 

Information technology consulting firms of India
Software companies of India
Technology companies established in 2009
Information technology companies of Bangalore
Indian companies established in 2009
2009 establishments in Karnataka